Zhari Namco or  Zhari Nanmu or  Lake Trari Nam is a salt lake in Tibet, China. It is bounded on the west by Coqên County of Ngari Prefecture, and on the east by Ngamring County of Shigatse Prefecture. It is located east of Coqên Town in southern Tibet.

Climate

References

Lakes of Tibet
Ngari Prefecture